was a Japanese politician from the Liberal Democratic Party. He served as a member of the House of Councillors from 1992 to 1998.

References

1928 births
2014 deaths
Politicians from Tokyo
Members of the House of Councillors (Japan)
Liberal Democratic Party (Japan) politicians